Dominique Hasler (born 6 October 1978) is a Liechtensteiner politician, and member of the Patriotic Union. Following the 2017 general election, she became Minister of Home Affairs, Education and Environment. She was appointed to be Minister of Foreign Affairs, Education, and Sport by Prime Minister Daniel Risch in March 2021.

Career
Born Dominique Matt on 6 October 1978, she grew up in Mauren, Liechtenstein. She took the surname Gantenbein following the marriage of her mother. She progressed into teaching, studying at the Intercantonal College of Special Education in Zurich, Switzerland. Gantenbein then worked as a special education teacher at several schools, before studying herself for a Master's degree in Business Administration in Entrepreneurial Management at the University of Liechtenstein.

Following the 2017 general election in Liechtenstein, Gantenbein was named as the Minister of Home Affairs, Education and Environment in the new parliament on 30 March. She was one of two members of the Patriotic Union named as Ministers in the coalition Government. She has since met with her education counterpart in the Government of Austria, Sonja Hammerschmid, regarding ongoing cooperation in work with school leavers. Gantenbein has also taken up her seat at the European Union Home Affairs Council as part of her work as Interior Minister.

After her wedding to Daniel Hasler in October 2018 she took her husband's family name.

References

External links

1978 births
Living people
20th-century Liechtenstein women
21st-century women politicians
21st-century Liechtenstein politicians
21st-century Liechtenstein women
Female foreign ministers
Female interior ministers
Foreign ministers of Liechtenstein
Education ministers of Liechtenstein
Environment ministers of Liechtenstein
Interior ministers of Liechtenstein
Sports ministers of Liechtenstein
Patriotic Union (Liechtenstein) politicians
Women government ministers of Liechtenstein